Thomas is a 1985 Finnish-language opera in three acts by Einojuhani Rautavaara to a libretto by the composer based on the life of Thomas, 13th Century bishop of Finland.

Recording
Thomas - Jorma Hynninen (baritone -Thomas, Bishop of Finland), Sini Rautavaara (soprano - Maiden), Peter Lindroos (tenor - Johann von Gobyn, Knight of the Sword), Matti Piipponen (tenor - Mäster Styver, a Merchant from Gotland) Joensuu City Orchestra , Savonlinna Opera Festival Chorus, Pekka Haapasalo

References

Operas
1985 operas
Finnish-language operas
Operas by Einojuhani Rautavaara
Operas based on real people